Ilya Vasilyevich Viznovich (born 10 February 1998) is a Russian football player. He plays as a centre-forward for Sokol Saratov.

Club career
He made his debut in the Russian Professional Football League for FC Lada-Togliatti on 18 April 2015 in a game against FC Chelyabinsk.

He made his Russian Premier League debut for FC Krylia Sovetov Samara on 11 May 2016 in a game against FC Krasnodar.

References

External links
 Profile by Russian Professional Football League

1998 births
Sportspeople from Tolyatti
Living people
Russian footballers
Association football forwards
Russia youth international footballers
Russia under-21 international footballers
FC Lada-Tolyatti players
PFC Krylia Sovetov Samara players
FC Luch Vladivostok players
FC Shinnik Yaroslavl players
FC Tom Tomsk players
FC Irtysh Omsk players
FC Metallurg Lipetsk players
FC Sokol Saratov players
Russian Premier League players
Russian First League players
Russian Second League players